Pińczata  is a village in the administrative district of Gmina Włocławek, within Włocławek County, Kuyavian-Pomeranian Voivodeship, in north-central Poland. It is located within the historic region of Kuyavia.

The village has a population of 750.

During the occupation of Poland (World War II), the forest of Pińczata was the site of German massacres of Poles from Włocławek, carried out as part of the Intelligenzaktion.

References

Villages in Włocławek County
Nazi war crimes in Poland